Ololygon carnevallii is a species of frogs in the family Hylidae.

It is endemic to Brazil.

Its natural habitats are subtropical or tropical moist lowland forests, freshwater lakes, and freshwater marshes.
It is threatened by habitat loss.

References

carnevallii
Endemic fauna of Brazil
Frogs of South America
Amphibians described in 1989
Taxa named by Ulisses Caramaschi
Taxonomy articles created by Polbot